Sitinsky is a rural locality (a settlement) in Kharovskoye Rural Settlement, Kharovsky District, Vologda Oblast, Russia. The population was 227 as of 2002. There are 5 streets.

Geography 
Sitinsky is located 6 km northwest of Kharovsk (the district's administrative centre) by road. Tyushkovskaya is the nearest rural locality.

References 

Rural localities in Kharovsky District